Monte Sciguello is a mountain in Liguria, northern Italy, part of the Ligurian Apennines.

Toponimy 
The mountain's name comes from the Ligurian term sciguelu, which means whistle, flute.

References

Mountains of Liguria
One-thousanders of Italy
Mountains of the Apennines